Stenandrium pohlii, with Portuguese common names caiapiá or carapiá, is a plant native to Cerrado and Pantanal vegetation of Brazil. The description of the plant was published in Flora Brasiliensis in 1847.

References

External links 
 
 Stenandrium pohlii at Tropicos
  Flora Brasiliensis: Stenandrium pohlii

pohlii
Flora of Brazil
Plants described in 1847